Södertälje Fotbollsarena is a multipurpose stadium in Södertälje, Sweden.  It is currently used mostly for football matches and is the home stadium of Assyriska FF and Syrianska FC.  The stadium holds 6,400 people and was built in 2005.

Average attendances

Football venues in Sweden
Multi-purpose stadiums in Sweden
Buildings and structures in Stockholm County
Sport in Södertälje